This is a list of Xbox One X enhanced games. These games are Xbox One and backwards compatible Xbox 360 and Xbox games that are enhanced by console-specific updates/patches when played on an Xbox One X.

Xbox One games without an Xbox One X update/patch, including Xbox 360 and Xbox backwards compatible titles, can also take advantage of the Xbox One X's hardware. These improvements can include the following:

 Improved framerate stability
 Games utilizing a dynamic resolution will hit their max resolution more often, or at all times
 16x anisotropic filtering
 Forced V-sync to decrease or eliminate screen tearing.
 Variable refresh rate compatibility (when used with a compatible display)

Difference between 4K Ultra HD, HDR, and Xbox One X enhanced games

Xbox One X enhanced (declaration) – Games that are said to be Xbox One X Enhanced offer one or more of the following benefits over non-Enhanced editions:
 Graphic enhancements
 Additional visual effects
 Higher framerate
 Higher resolution (up to 4K, depending on the user's TV)
4K Ultra HD (declaration) – 4K refers to image resolution, or the number of pixels used for each image. Games described as being 4K offer a resolution of 3840 pixels × 2160 lines, offering substantially higher resolution than 1080p HD. To view 4K games at their native resolution, the user's TV must be 4K-capable.
HDR (High dynamic range) (declaration) – Visual dynamic range refers to the difference between the darkest and brightest information a game can show. As suggested by the term HDR some games offer darker darks and brighter brights than others, depending on the screen you view them on. HDR on Xbox has a 10-bit color range, or wide color gamut, which uses more colors for a richer, more detailed image. On Xbox, this feature also goes by the name Dolby Vision, which is used by some video apps.
Dolby Atmos – The game supports Dolby Atmos surround sound.

List of enhanced titles
There are currently  games on this list.

See also
List of Xbox One games
List of backward-compatible games for Xbox One and Series X

External links
Xbox.com - Xbox One X Enhanced Games List

References

 
Xbox
Ultra-high-definition television